Świeca or Swieca may refer to:

 Świeca, Greater Poland Voivodeship, village in Poland
 Henry Swieca (born 1957), American billionaire
 Jorge A. Swieca (1936–1980), Brazilian physicist

See also
 

Polish-language surnames